Paluweh, also known as Rokatenda, is a stratovolcano that forms the small island of Palu'e, north of Flores Island in Sikka Regency in the province of East Nusa Tenggara, Indonesia.

Several flank vents occur along a northwest trending fissure.


Eruption history 
Eruptions with a Volcanic Explosivity Index (VEI) of 3 have occurred in 1650 ± 50, 1928 and 1972. On 16 January 2005, there were signs of a possible eruption, causing the mountain to be placed under alert status.

1928
The biggest eruption (VEI 3) occurred on August 4, – September 25, 1928, the eruption caused a tsunami and earthquake. The population of Palu'e island was 266 people at that period.

2012–2013
In late 2012 the mountain became quite active, spewing volcanic ash. In November 2012, and continuing into 2013, a 3 km exclusion zone was set up and residents living around the mountain were evacuated or moved to Maumere city on the main island of Flores. In the first 8 months of 2013 there was regular activity from the lava dome including repeated ash plumes – generally reaching altitudes of 2–3 km – dome collapses, explosions, avalanches and pyroclastic flows.

August 2013
On 10 August 2013, the mountain erupted for about seven minutes and spewed ash about  into the air. Initial reports had the death toll at six. The victims were three adults and two children, and the age of the sixth victim is unclear. The bodies of the adults were recovered from Ponge beach in Rokirole village, but the remains of the children were not found. A number of the island residents refused to leave the island after an earlier mandatory evacuation order had been issued; they had grown accustomed to the volcanic activity.

References

External links
Paluweh
Landsat Thermal Sensor Lights Up from Volcano's Heat

Active volcanoes of Indonesia
Stratovolcanoes of Indonesia
Volcanoes of the Lesser Sunda Islands
Mountains of Indonesia